SK Polaban Nymburk is a football club located in the town of Nymburk in the Central Bohemian Region of the Czech Republic. The club currently plays in the Bohemian Football League.

The club played in the Czechoslovak First League, the top flight of Czechoslovak football, in the 1945–46 season. The club also played top-flight football in the early 1940s.

Historical names
 SK Nymburk (1900–1901)
 SK Polaban Nymburk (1902–1948)
 Lokomotiva Nymburk (1949–1952)
 ČSD Nymburk (1952–1953)
 Lokomotiva Nymburk (1953–1991)
 Polaban Nymburk (1991–2005)
 SK POLABAN Nymburk (od 2005)

References

External links
 

Football clubs in the Czech Republic
Association football clubs established in 1900
Czechoslovak First League clubs
Nymburk District
20th-century establishments in Bohemia
1900 establishments in Austria-Hungary